A black project is a highly classified, top-secret military or defense project that is not publicly acknowledged by government, military personnel, or contractors. Examples of United States military aircraft developed as black projects include the Lockheed F-117 Nighthawk stealth attack aircraft and the Northrop Grumman B-2 Spirit stealth bomber, both of which were highly classified and publicly denied until they were ready to be announced to the public. In the United States, the formal term for a black project is special access program (SAP). The money that funds these projects is called the black budget.

Examples

United States

Previously classified 
 Manhattan Project
 B-2 Spirit stealth bomber
 Sikorsky UH-60 Black Hawk stealth helicopter
 Boeing Bird of Prey stealth technology demonstrator
 F-117 Nighthawk stealth ground-attack aircraft
 KH-11 Kennen reconnaissance satellite
 SR-71 Blackbird Mach 3.3 very high-altitude reconnaissance aircraft
 Lockheed CL-400 Suntan high-altitude, high-speed reconnaissance prototype
 Lockheed U-2 very high-altitude reconnaissance aircraft
 Lockheed Martin RQ-170 Sentinel
 Lockheed Martin Polecat unmanned aerial vehicle
 Northrop Tacit Blue
 Operation Cyclone
 RQ-3 Dark Star high altitude reconnaissance UAV
 Lockheed Sea Shadow (IX-529) experimental stealth US Navy ship
 Hughes Mining Barge CIA project authorized 1974 to raise sunken Soviet submarine K-129
 SR-72 stealth reconnaissance UAV, confirmed by Lockheed Martin in October 2013.

Speculated or classified
 Stealth Blimp Reconnaissance platform
 Aurora
 TR-3

People's Republic of China
 Xian H-20 subsonic stealth bomber aircraft

South Africa
 Project Coast
 Atlas Carver multirole fighter aircraft

See also
 Open secret
 Black operation
 Black budget
 Skunk Works

References

United States defense procurement
Secret government programs